Donawitz Stadium is a multi-use stadium in Leoben, Austria. It is used mostly for football matches and is the home ground of DSV Leoben. The stadium holds 6,000 people and was built in 2000.

Football venues in Austria
Leoben
Buildings and structures in Styria